The Guy Arab was a bus chassis manufactured by Guy Motors. It was introduced in 1933 as a double deck chassis.

In 1942, Guy launched a modified version with wartime constraints requiring components previously made of aluminium to be made from cast iron, increasing its weight by 20%. Over 2,700 were built during the war years.

After the war, a single deck version was introduced, while the pre-war double deck version was reintroduced. It remained in production until the 1970s.

The West Riding Automobile Company of Wakefield had a large number of Guy Arabs and one, KHL855, is preserved at the Dewsbury Bus Museum and has been restored to "as delivered" condition.

References

External links

Double-decker buses
Single-deck buses
Vehicles introduced in 1933